Municipal elections were held in Rome on 13 and 27 May 2001 to elect the Mayor of Rome and 60 members of the City Council, as well as the nineteen presidents and more than 400 councillors of the 19 municipi in which the municipality was divided. The first round of the elections occurred on the same date of the national general election.

The outgoing Mayor Francesco Rutelli, term-limited by the Italian law on local government, had resigned from his position on 8 January that year to run as the main candidate of The Olive Tree in the national general election.

The two main candidates were the former Minister of Cultural Heritage, former Deputy Prime Minister and incumbent secretary of the Democrats of the Left (DS) Walter Veltroni and the liberal-conservative MEP Antonio Tajani, a prominent member of Silvio Berlusconi's Forza Italia (FI).

Since none of the candidates obtained the majority of votes on the first round, a second round vote was held on 27 May 2001. As a result of the election, Veltroni was elected mayor with 52% of votes and sworn in on 1 June 2001.

Background
Following the end of the parliamentary legislature, Rutelli was chosen to lead the centre-left coalition in the 2001 general election and resigned as Mayor of Rome on 8 January 2001, just two days after the end of the Great Jubilee.

Mayoral election
The House of Freedoms had been heavily defeated in the previous municipal election. Tajani rejected a formal alliance with the far-right parties and preferred a liberal-conservative coalition, like the one which supported Silvio Berlusconi in the general election.

Thanks to the overlap with the general election, which saw a huge victor of the House of Freedoms alliance, the centre-right coalition unexpectedly succeeded to win a majority of votes across the city. Although a strong performance of his coalition, Tajani wasn't able to win the race and on the second round he had to concede to Veltroni, who showed to have a strong support in the city. Despite the lower number of votes, the centre-left coalition obtained the majority of seats in the City Council thanks to the electoral system's mechanisms.

Voting System
The voting system is used for all mayoral elections in Italy, in the city with a population higher than 15,000 inhabitants. Under this system voters express a direct choice for the mayor or an indirect choice voting for the party of the candidate's coalition. If no candidate receives 50% of votes, the top two candidates go to a second round after two weeks. This gives a result whereby the winning candidate may be able to claim majority support, although it is not guaranteed.

The election of the city council is based on a direct choice for the candidate with a preference vote: the candidate with the majority of the preferences is elected. The number of the seats for each party is determined proportionally.

Parties and candidates
This is a list of the major parties (and their respective leaders) which participated in the election.

Results

Notes

Municipi election

In January 2001 the City Council of Rome approved a new decentralization reform. The previous circoscrizioni were renamed municipi and the direct election in two different rounds of a president to head each municipio was established.

Table below shows the results for each municipio with the percentage for each coalition on the first round:

Table below shows the results for each municipio with the percentage for each coalition on the second round:

Source: Municipality of Rome - Electoral Service

References

2001 elections in Italy
Rome
Rome
Elections in Rome
May 2001 events in Europe
2000s in Rome